Offending Angels is a 2000 British romantic comedy film directed by Andrew Rajan.

Plot summary
Sam and Baggy are two non-committal slackers who while their time away with nonsensical affairs while dreaming of greater things in life. Paris and Zeke are two guardian angels who confront them with plans for change. Paris is a former dolphin while Zeke is a former squirrel.

Cast
Susannah Harker as Paris
Shaun Parkes as Zeke
Andrew Lincoln as Sam
Andrew Rajan as Baggy
Jack Davenport as Rory
Stephen Mangan as Fergus
Michael Cochrane as Mentor
Jesse Hopkins as Young Sam

Reception
The film became notorious because it took less than £100 at the box office. It had a £70,000 budget and did very well on the festival circuit, selling out at every attendance; Gothenburg 2002, Raindance 2001, Emden 2002 and as the opening Gala Film at the Berlin Britspotting Festival, 2002. It was subsequently picked up by Ardent International sales agents on the strength of press reviews and actors performances, just at the time when Ardent CEO Prince Edward exited the industry, which proved to be terrible timing for the film release in the UK.

Critics
The film polarized critics; panned by some including the BBC, who called it a "truly awful pile of garbage", and Total Film, who called it "irredeemable", but Film Review called it "A rather heartwarming story of the need to remember to live your life".

Awards and nominations
Emden International Film Festival
Nominated, "Emden Film Award" – Andrew Rajan

References

External links
 
 
 http://www.pantsproductions.com/5667.html

2000 films
2000 romantic comedy-drama films
British romantic comedy-drama films
2000 comedy films
2000 drama films
2000s English-language films
2000s British films